Forza Milan! was a monthly Italian sports magazine entirely dedicated to the football club A.C. Milan. It existed between 1963 and 2018.

History and profile
Forza Milan! was founded in 1963 by Italian journalist Gino Sansoni. The magazine published on a monthly basis. It featured articles, posters and photos of AC Milan players including both the first team players and the youth system kids, as well as club employees. It also featured anecdotes and famous episodes from the club's history. The last issue of the magazine published in June 2018 featuring Gennaro Gattuso on the cover.

See also
 List of magazines published in Italy

References

External links
 Official website 
 Forza Milan! at Guide.SuperEva.it 

1963 establishments in Italy
2018 disestablishments in Italy
A.C. Milan
Association football magazines
Defunct magazines published in Italy
Italian-language magazines
Magazines established in 1963
Magazines disestablished in 2018
Magazines published in Milan
Monthly magazines published in Italy]
Sports mass media in Italy